Domagrozumab (PF-06252616) (INN) is a humanized monoclonal antibody designed for the treatment of Duchenne muscular dystrophy.

This drug was developed by Pfizer.

References 

Monoclonal antibodies